Paint River is a  river in the U.S. state of Michigan.

It is a tributary of the Brule River and flows through Gogebic and Iron counties. Via the Brule River, it is part of the Menominee River watershed, flowing to Lake Michigan.

The Paint River flows through Crystal Falls, Michigan, and empties into the Brule River before its confluence with the Michigamme River to form the Menominee.

References

Rivers of Michigan
Rivers of Gogebic County, Michigan
Rivers of Iron County, Michigan
Tributaries of Lake Michigan
Wild and Scenic Rivers of the United States